Padehi (also Romanized as Padeh’ī and Padehī; also known as Padai, Padā’ī, Padegī, and Padī) is a village in Qorqori Rural District, Qorqori District, Hirmand County, Sistan and Baluchestan Province, Iran. At the 2006 census, its population was 130, in 33 families.

References 

Populated places in Hirmand County